Steve Fritz (born November 1, 1967 in Salina, Kansas) is an American retired decathlete.

Fritz played basketball and competed in track and field for Kansas State University. He was an All-American and Big 12 champion decathlete in 1989 and 1990. Fritz set the Kansas State school record for points in the decathlon. Fritz represented the United States on 10 national teams for decathlon, including a first-place finish at the 1991 Summer Universiade in Sheffield, England and a fourth-place finish at the 1996 Olympic Games in Atlanta, Georgia.

Fritz was named to the K-State Athletics Hall of Fame in 2000 and enshrined to the Kansas Sports Hall of Fame on October 4, 2020.

Fritz was an assistant coach for the Kansas State track and field team for 21 years, and is currently the assistant basketball coach at Wamego High School. He is also the track coach at Wamego High School.

Personal life
His wife, Suzie Fritz, is the current head coach of the Kansas State Wildcats women's volleyball team.

His son, T.J. Fritz, played basketball for Wamego High School, where he averaged 22.4 points per game in 2018 as a senior, which led Kansas Class 4A. Fritz then reclassified from the class of 2019 to the class of 2020 and enrolled at Sunrise Christian Academy in Bel Aire, KS, considered one of the best basketball high schools in the world, to play for their postgraduate team. After his season at Sunrise, Fritz committed to the University of Nebraska-Kearney on April 15, 2020.

Achievements

References

External links

GBR Athletics

1967 births
Living people
Sportspeople from Salina, Kansas
Kansas State Wildcats men's basketball players
American male decathletes
Athletes (track and field) at the 1996 Summer Olympics
Olympic track and field athletes of the United States
Universiade medalists in athletics (track and field)
Goodwill Games medalists in athletics
American men's basketball players
Universiade gold medalists for the United States
Medalists at the 1991 Summer Universiade
Competitors at the 1994 Goodwill Games